Mansour bin Abdulaziz Al Saud ( Manṣūr ibn ‘Abdul‘azīz Āl Su‘ūd; 1921 – 2 May 1951) was a Saudi royal and politician who served as the defense minister of Saudi Arabia between 1943 and 1951. During his lifetime Prince Mansour was the third most powerful son of King Abdulaziz after Prince Faisal and Crown Prince Saud.

Early life and education
Prince Mansour was born in Qasr Al Hukm, Riyadh, in 1921. He is widely believed to be the ninth son of King Abdulaziz, but William A. Eddy argues that Prince Mansour is the sixth son of Abdulaziz. His mother was an Armenian woman, Shahida (died 1938), who was reportedly the favorite wife of King Abdulaziz. She was of Christian origin. Prince Mansour's full siblings were Prince Mishaal, Prince Mutaib, and Princess Qumash.

At age seven Prince Mansour's education began with a private tutor, and he studied Quran and Arabic. Then he was sent to the Saudi Institute in Mecca for further education where he received high school-level education on religion, mathematics and geography.

Career
Prince Mansour's first government post was the supervision of the royal palaces in Riyadh which he was appointed in 1938. In 1940 he was made minister of war. In 1942 he participated in King Abdulaziz's meeting with the British ambassador in Riyadh. Prince Mansour was also the emir of Murabba Palace in 1943. He officially visited Cairo when King Abdulaziz sent him there to support the Indian Muslim officers and men just before the Battle of El Alamein. Prince Mansour also acted as an aide to Prince Faisal during the latter's post of viceroy of Hijaz. 

Then Prince Mansour was appointed minister of defense by King Abdulaziz on 10 November 1943 when the office was established which had been titled as the ministry of war since 1940. Therefore, he is the first defense minister of Saudi Arabia. In fact, the body was first named the ministry of defense and aviation. 

Between October and December 1943 King Abdulaziz sent Prince Mansour to Palestine to investigate the situation in the region. Two of the King's sons, Muhammad and Mansour, accompanied their father in his meetings with the US President Franklin D. Roosevelt on 14 February 1945 and British Prime Minister Winston Churchill in Egypt on 17 February 1945.

During Prince Mansour's term the first Saudi military personnel were sent to the United Kingdom to receive aviation training at several institutions, including the Training University Air Service, near Southampton, and the Academy of Aviation in Perth, Scotland. Prince Mansour visited the latter group. He also officially visited both the United Kingdom and the United States as a guest of these governments, and his visits were concerned with arms deals.

Prince Mansour's term as defense minister lasted until his death in 1951, and he was replaced by his full brother Prince Mishaal who had been his deputy at the ministry.

Personal life
Prince Mansour was married and had two children, Talal and Muhdi. Prince Talal (born 1951) was raised by his uncle Prince Mutaib following the death of his father. Prince Mutaib's daughter, Princess Nouf, married Prince Talal who was made a member of Allegiance Council in December 2007. Prince Mansour's daughter, Mudhi, published a book entitled Al Hijar Wa Natayjiha Fi 'Asir Al Malik 'Abdul'Aziz in 1993.

Death
Prince Mansour died of a heart attack in Paris on 2 May 1951. However, a USA diplomatic cable dated 2006 claims that he died of alcohol poisoning after a party hosted by his half-brother and governor of Riyadh Nasser bin Abdulaziz. It is further reported that upon hearing of this event, King Abdulaziz threw Prince Nasser in jail who subsequently lost his post and never returned to public life. Concerning the cause of Prince Mansour's death there are two other reports arguing that he died of kidney disease.

Prince Mansour was buried in Al Adl cemetery in Mecca.

Ancestry

References

External links

Mansour
1921 births
1951 deaths
Mansour
Mansour
Mansour
Mansour